Christopher Corcoran (born March 30, 1983, in Weymouth, Massachusetts) is an American soccer player, who is currently playing for Gamlakarleby Bollklubb.

Early life
Corcoran grew up in Marshfield, Massachusetts, where he attended Marshfield High School.

Career

College career
He then entered St. John's University, playing on the men's soccer team from 2001 to 2004. He finished his four seasons with twelve goals in seventy-five games.

Professional career
In 2002, he played for the Cape Cod Crusaders of the fourth division Premier Development League during the collegiate off season. In 2003, he spent the summer with the Brooklyn Knights. On January 14, 2005, the MetroStars selected Corcoran in the 3rd round (25th overall) in the 2005 MLS SuperDraft. Corcoran had difficulty recovering from two broken feet from his final game at St. John's and never saw first team time. He did play nine games with the reserves before being released on November 15, 2006.  That winter, he had trials with Limavady United in Northern Ireland and Falkirk FC Scotland but did not qualify for a work permit.  He returned to the United States to try out with the Columbus Crew.  He was not offered a contract and on April 20, 2006, he signed with the Charleston Battery of the USL First Division.

Finland
In April 2009, Corcoran signed with Ekenäs Idrottsförening and played in 31 games and scored 10 goals while there for 2 seasons. On February 4, 2011, he left Ekenäs IF and signed with Gamlakarleby Bollklubb.

References

1984 births
Living people
American soccer players
Cape Cod Crusaders players
Brooklyn Knights players
New York Red Bulls players
USL First Division players
Charleston Battery players
USL League Two players
Expatriate footballers in Finland
St. John's Red Storm men's soccer players
New York Red Bulls draft picks
Ekenäs IF players
Soccer players from Massachusetts
Association football defenders
GBK Kokkola players